On Air – Live at the BBC Volume 2 is a 2013 live/compilation album featuring 40 previously unreleased tracks from the Beatles' 1963–1964 BBC Radio broadcasts (accompanied by 23 interview tracks from the associated broadcasts). It was released on 11 November 2013, along with a remastered and repackaged Live at the BBC Volume 1, which was originally released in 1994. The album is available as a two-CD set and a three-LP set. An exclusive limited edition lithographic print is also available from the Beatles online store.

Content
Most of the songs performed live on the album are taken from the Beatles' first four LPs Please Please Me, With the Beatles, A Hard Day's Night and Beatles for Sale. Many of the other songs performed are the band's covers of early rock and roll classics by American artists such as Little Richard, Chuck Berry and Buddy Holly, many of which were never recorded in a studio or released on a Beatles album during the group's time together. "I'm Talking About You" had appeared on various releases, of dubious legality, from 1977 onwards featuring material recorded in December 1962 at the Star Club in Hamburg, Germany. "Beautiful Dreamer" had never been on a previous Beatles release, leaving only "Dream Baby (How Long Must I Dream)" and "A Picture of You", both low fidelity recordings with Pete Best from 1962, as the only songs from the Beatles' BBC performances that have never been issued in any version.

There are several witty and irreverent moments among the 23 speech tracks of in-studio conversation and banter with Brian Matthew, presenter of radio's 'Saturday Club' and 'Easy Beat'. "A Hard Job Writing Them", for example, includes the moment where Ringo describes the trouble he had writing songs for A Hard Day's Night and Paul launches the ship "Top Gear" in an unusual voice.

Reception

The album received very positive reviews upon release. Damian Fanelli from Guitar World said the album is "an exceedingly satisfying release, yet another example of how talented, charming and generally 'different' the Beatles were. In terms of George Harrison's guitar playing, we get to hear the good (his whammy-bar-laced guitar solo on 'Till There Was You'), the not so good (his solo on 'Lucille') and the intriguing (His better-than-the-EMI-version solo on 'I Saw Her Standing There' inspires a few 'What ifs?')."

Mojo music writer Jon Savage reviewed the album, giving it four stars and stated, "There are several surprises: a tough version of Chuck Berry's 'I'm Talking About You', an early 'Words of Love', covers of 'Lend Me Your Comb' and 'Beautiful Dreamer'."

Track listing
Speech tracks are in italics.

Source programmes
The show's title and original broadcast date for each track, with the recording date in parentheses:

Saturday Club, 26 January 1963 (22 January 1963)
Disc 1
"Beautiful Dreamer"
Here We Go, 12 March 1963 (6 March 1963)
Disc 1
"Misery"
Saturday Club, 16 March 1963 (transmitted live)
Disc 1
"I'm Talking About You"
Pop Go the Beatles (4), 25 June 1963 (17 June 1963)
Disc 1
"Hey, Paul..."
"Hello!"
"A Real Treat"
"Boys"
"Absolutely Fab"
"Chains"
"Bumper Bundle"
"P.S. I Love You"
Pop Go the Beatles (5), 16 July 1963 (2 July 1963)
Disc 1
"Lend Me Your Comb"
Pop Go the Beatles (6), 23 July 1963 (10 July 1963)
Disc 1
"And Here We Are Again"
Pop Go the Beatles (7), 30 July 1963 (10 July 1963)
Disc 1
"How About It, Gorgeous?"
"Do You Want to Know a Secret"
"Till There Was You"
"Please Mr. Postman"
Pop Go the Beatles (8), 6 August 1963 (16 July 1963)
Disc 1
"Twist and Shout"
Pop Go the Beatles (9), 13 August 1963 (16 July 1963)
Disc 1
"Please Please Me"
Pop Go the Beatles (10), 20 August 1963 (16 July 1963)
Disc 1
"Words of Love"

Saturday Club, 24 August 1963 (30 July 1963)
Disc 2 
"Glad All Over"
"Lift Lid Again"
Pop Go the Beatles (11), 27 August 1963 (1 August 1963)
Disc 1
"Anna (Go to Him)"
Pop Go the Beatles (12), 3 September 1963 (1 August 1963)
Disc 1
"Roll Over Beethoven"
"There's a Place"
Pop Go the Beatles (13), 10 September 1963 (3 September 1963)
Disc 1
"Lower 5E"
"Hippy Hippy Shake"
Pop Go the Beatles (14), 17 September 1963 (3 September 1963)
Disc 1
"Lucille"
Pop Go the Beatles (15), 24 September 1963 (3 September 1963)
Disc 1
"Ask Me Why"
"Devil in Her Heart"
"The 49 Weeks"
"Sure to Fall (In Love with You)"
"Never Mind, Eh?"
"Bye, Bye"
Saturday Club, 5 October 1963 (7 September 1963)
Disc 2 
"I Saw Her Standing There"
"I'll Get You"
"She Loves You"
"Memphis, Tennessee"
"Happy Birthday Dear Saturday Club"
Easy Beat, 20 October 1963 (16 October 1963)
Disc 2 
"Now Hush, Hush"
"From Me to You"
Saturday Club, 21 December 1963 (17 December 1963)
Disc 2 
"Brian Bathtubes"
"This Boy"

From Us to You (1), 26 December 1963 (18 December 1963)
Disc 2 
"Money (That's What I Want)"
"I Want to Hold Your Hand"
Saturday Club, 15 February 1964 (7 January 1964)
Disc 2 
"If I Wasn't in America"
From Us to You (2), 30 March 1964 (28 February 1964)
Disc 2 
"Oh, Can't We? Yes We Can"
Saturday Club, 4 April 1964 (31 March 1964)
Disc 2 
"I Got a Woman"
Top Gear, 16 July 1964 (14 July 1964)
Disc 2 
"Long Tall Sally"
"If I Fell"
"A Hard Job Writing Them"
"And I Love Her"
"You Can't Do That"
Top Gear, 26 November 1964 (17 November 1964)
Disc 2 
"Honey Don't"
"I'll Follow the Sun"
"That's What We're Here For"
"I Feel Fine" (unaired)
Saturday Club, 26 December 1964 (25 November 1964)
Disc 2 
"Kansas City / Hey-Hey-Hey-Hey!"
Top of the Pops BBC Transcription Service, May or June 1965
Disc 2 
"Green with Black Shutters"
BBC Transcription Service, 30 November 1965
Disc 1
"John – Pop Profile"
"George – Pop Profile"
BBC Transcription Service, 2 May 1966
Disc 2 
"Paul – Pop Profile"
"Ringo – Pop Profile"

Personnel
 John Lennon – vocals, rhythm guitar, harmonica
 Paul McCartney – vocals, bass guitar, guitar
 George Harrison – lead guitar, vocals
 Ringo Starr – drums, percussion, vocals

Charts and certifications

Weekly charts

Year-end charts

Certifications

References

2013 compilation albums
2013 live albums
Apple Records compilation albums
Apple Records live albums
BBC Radio recordings
Capitol Records compilation albums
Capitol Records live albums
Compilation albums published posthumously
Live albums published posthumously
Radio programmes about the Beatles
The Beatles compilation albums
The Beatles live albums
Universal Music Enterprises compilation albums
Universal Music Enterprises live albums